A pyramid is a structure with triangular lateral surfaces converging to an apex.

Pyramid may also refer to:

Anatomy and medicine
 Petrous part of the temporal bone, the pyramid
 Pyramid (brainstem), the anterior part of medulla oblongata

Games and sport
 Pyramid (solitaire), a card game
 Pyramid (drinking game), a card game that is most commonly used as a drinking game
 Puzzling Pyramid, magnetic puzzle game released in 1960.
 Pyramid (video game), a 1990s Nintendo game by American Video Entertainment
 Pyramid 2000, a 1980s TRS-80 Color Computer interactive fiction text game based on the Colossal Cave Adventure
 Human pyramid, a vertically oriented, triangular or pyramid-shaped formation of people
 Pyramid pool, or pyramids, a cue sport played mainly in the 19th century
 Russian pyramid, known as "pyramid", a pool/snooker type game
 League system, a hierarchy of leagues in a given sport
 Pyramid, a three-dimensional chess variant
 Pyramid, a fictional sport in the science-fiction TV show  Battlestar Galactica

Television and film
 Several television game shows with the same format, created by Bob Stewart and now controlled by Sony Pictures Television:
 Pyramid (game show), the United States versions since 1973, including The $25,000 Pyramid and Junior Pyramid
 Pyramid (Australian game show), a children's quiz show in Australia since 2009, based on the U.S. Junior Partner Pyramid
 The PyraMMMid, 2011 crime film
 The Pyramid (film), 2014 horror film
 The Pyramid (TV series), a Croatian weekly talk and debate competition television show begun in 2004
 "The Pyramid", a 1978 episode of The Bionic Woman

Publications and publishing
 Pyramid (magazine), a gaming magazine
 Pyramids (novel), a 1989 Terry Pratchett book of the Discworld series
 The Pyramid (Golding novel), a 1967 novel by William Golding
 The Pyramid (Kadare novel), a 1995 Albanian novel by Ismail Kadare
 The Pyramid (short stories), by Henning Mankell, published first as Pyramiden in Swedish in 1999 and afterwards in English in 2008
 Pyramid Books, a publishing company

Music
 Pyramid (band), an American experimental, indie-rock band from North Carolina and active since the early 2000s
 Pyramids, an American experimental group on Hydra Head Records in the 2000s, from Texas
 Pyramids (album), their 2008 debut studio album
 The Pyramids (band), an American surf rock group in the 1960s, from California
 The Pyramids, a jazz and world music group formed in the 1970s and led by Idris Ackamoor
 Symarip, a British reggae group also known as The Pyramids, active from the 1960s to the 1970s
 Starfucker, an indie-electronica band from Oregon, started in 2007 as Pyramid or Pyramiddd
 Pyramid (The Alan Parsons Project album), 1978
 Pyramid (Modern Jazz Quartet album), 1960
 Pyramid (Cannonball Adderley album), 1974
 Pyramid (Lee Konitz album)
 Pyramid Rock Festival, in Victoria, Australia

 Songs
 "Pyramid" (song), by Charice
 "Pyramids" (song), by Frank Ocean
 "Pyramid", a song by Wolfmother on the album Wolfmother
 "Pyramid", a song by Two Door Cinema Club
 "Pyramid", an instrumental song by Incognito (band)

Places

Canada 
 The Pyramid (British Columbia), a lava dome in British Columbia
 Pyramid Mountain (Wells Gray-Clearwater), a subglacial mound in British Columbia
 Pyramid Lake (Alberta)

United States 
 Pyramid, Illinois, an unincorporated community
 Pyramid, Kentucky, an unincorporated community
 Pyramid, Nevada, an unincorporated community
 Pyramid Lake (El Dorado County, California)
 Pyramid Lake (Los Angeles County, California)
 Pyramid Lake (Nevada)
 Pyramid Peak (disambiguation)

Elsewhere 

 The Egyptian Pyramids, especially the Pyramids at Giza
 Pyramids (Bathgate), a land sculpture in West Lothian, Scotland
 The Pyramids, a rock formation at Victory Beach, New Zealand
 The Pyramid (Chatham Islands), a small island in the Chatham Islands, New Zealand
 The Pyramid (Antarctica), a distinctive peak in Victoria Land, Antarctica
 Pyramid, Maribor, a low hill in the city of Maribor, Slovenia
 Great Pyramid of Cholula, Mexico
Pyramiden, an abandoned Soviet coal mining settlement on the Norwegian archipelago of Svalbard

Buildings 
 Louvre Pyramid (Pyramide du Louvre), one large and three smaller glass and metal pyramids in the main courtyard of the Louvre Palace in Paris, France
 Portsmouth Pyramids Centre, a leisure complex in the UK
 Memphis Pyramid, in Memphis, Tennessee
 The Pyramids (Indianapolis), an office development in Indiana
 Walter Pyramid (formerly Long Beach Pyramid), a stadium in California

In business 
 Pyramid scheme, a non-sustainable business model
 Pyramid Breweries, a brewing company headquartered in Seattle, Washington
 Pyramid Building Society, an Australian company which collapsed in 1990
 Pyramid Technology, a defunct computer company based in California from 1981 to 1995
 The Pyramid Companies, an American shopping mall developer founded in 1970

Science and technology 
 Pyramid (geometry), a polyhedron formed by connecting a polygonal base and a point, called the apex
 Pyramid (image processing), a type of multi-scale signal representation
 Pyramid (web framework), an open source web application framework written in Python
 The codename of a project aiming to rewrite Microsoft Word from scratch
 Ecological pyramid

Other uses
 A type of organizational structure
 Hierarchy

See also
 Piramida (disambiguation)
 Pyramide (disambiguation)
 Pyramiden, a mining settlement in Svalbard, Norway